Zimbabwe competed at the 1980 Summer Paralympics in Arnhem, Netherlands. 5 competitors from Zimbabwe won 12 medals, 8 silver and 4 bronze, and finished 34th in the medal table.

See also 
 Zimbabwe at the Paralympics
 Zimbabwe at the 1980 Summer Olympics

References 

Zimbabwe at the Paralympics
1980 in Zimbabwean sport
Nations at the 1980 Summer Paralympics